Thrasymachus (fl. 4th century BCE) of Corinth, was a philosopher of the Megarian school. Little is known about him except that he was colleague and friend of Ichthyas, and he had presumably been taught by Euclid of Megara, the founder of the school. He was said to have been the teacher of Stilpo.

Notes

References
D. Zeyl, D. Devereux, P. Mitsis, (1997), Encyclopedia of Classical Philosophy, page 329.

4th-century BC Greek people
4th-century BC philosophers
Ancient Corinthians
Classical Greek philosophers
Megarian philosophers